Carabus cavernosus variolatus is a subspecies of black coloured ground beetle in the subfamily Carabinae that is endemic to Central Italy.

References

cavernosus variolatus
Beetles described in 1837
Beetles of Europe
Endemic fauna of Italy
Taxa named by Oronzio Gabriele Costa